"Believe Me" is a song by British producer Navos. It was released on 22 January 2021, via Island Records. The song went viral on TikTok and reached number 23 on the UK Singles Chart.

Music video
An accompanying music video was released on 19 March 2021.

Charts

Weekly charts

Year-end charts

References

2021 singles
2021 songs
Island Records singles
Universal Music Group singles